Lancelot Brown (born c. 1715–16, baptised 30 August 1716 – 6 February 1783), more commonly known as Capability Brown, was an English gardener and landscape architect, who remains the most famous figure in the history of the English landscape garden style. He is remembered as "the last of the great English 18th-century artists to be accorded his due" and "England's greatest gardener".

Unlike other architects including William Kent, he was a hands-on gardener and provided his clients with a full turnkey service, designing the gardens and park, and then managing their landscaping and planting.  He is most famous for the landscaped parks of English country houses, many of which have survived reasonably intact. However, he also included in his plans "pleasure gardens" with flower gardens and the new shrubberies, usually placed where they would not obstruct the views across the park of and from the main facades of the house. Few of his plantings of "pleasure gardens" have survived later changes.  He also submitted plans for much smaller urban projects, for example the college gardens along The Backs at Cambridge.

Criticism of his style, both in his own day and subsequently, mostly centres on the claim that "he created 'identikit' landscapes with the main house in a sea of turf, some water, albeit often an impressive feature, and trees in clumps and shelterbelts," giving "a uniformity equating to authoritarianism" and showing a lack of imagination and even taste on the part of his patrons.

He designed more than 170 parks, many of which survive. He was nicknamed "Capability" because he would tell his clients that their property had "capability" for improvement. His influence was so great that the contributions to the English garden made by his predecessors Charles Bridgeman and William Kent are often overlooked; even Kent's champion Horace Walpole allowed that Kent "was succeeded by a very able master".

Early life and Stowe
Lancelot Brown was the fifth child of a land agent and a chambermaid, born in the village of Kirkharle, Northumberland, and educated at a school in Cambo until he was 16. Brown's father, William Brown, had been Sir William Loraine’s land agent and his mother, Ursula (née Hall), had been in service at Kirkharle Hall. His eldest brother, John, became the estate surveyor and later married Sir William's daughter. His older brother George became a mason-architect.

After school Lancelot worked as the head gardener's apprentice at Sir William Loraine's kitchen garden at Kirkharle Hall until he was 23. In 1739 he journeyed south to the port of Boston, Lincolnshire. Then he moved further inland, where his first landscape commission was for a new lake in the park at Kiddington Hall, Oxfordshire. He moved to Wotton Underwood House, Buckinghamshire, seat of Sir Richard Grenville.

In 1741 Brown joined Lord Cobham's gardening staff as undergardener at Stowe Gardens, Buckinghamshire, where he worked under William Kent, one of the founders of the new English style of landscape garden. In 1742, at the age of 26, he was officially appointed Head Gardener, earning £25 a year and residing in the western Boycott Pavilion.

Brown remained at Stowe until 1750. He made the Grecian Valley at Stowe under William Kent's supervision. It is an abstract composition of landform and woodland. Lord Cobham let Brown take freelance work from his aristocratic friends, thus making him well known as a landscape gardener. As a proponent of the new English style Brown became immensely sought after by the landed families. By 1751, when Brown was beginning to be widely known, Horace Walpole wrote somewhat slightingly of Brown's work at Warwick Castle:

The castle is enchanting; the view pleased me more than I can express, the River Avon tumbles down a cascade at the foot of it. It is well laid out by one Brown who has set up on a few ideas of Kent and Mr. Southcote.
By the 1760s, he was earning on average £6,000 a year, usually £500 for one commission. As an accomplished rider he was able to work fast, taking only an hour or so on horseback to survey an estate and rough out an entire design. In 1764, Brown was appointed King George III's Master Gardener at Hampton Court Palace, succeeding John Greening and residing at the Wilderness House. In 1767 he bought an estate for himself at Fenstanton in Huntingdonshire from the Earl of Northampton and was appointed High Sheriff of Cambridgeshire and Huntingdonshire for 1770, although his son Lance carried out most of the duties.

Landscape gardens
It is estimated that Brown was responsible for more than 170 gardens surrounding the finest country houses and estates in Britain. His work endures at Belvoir Castle, Croome Court (where he also designed the house), Blenheim Palace, Warwick Castle, Harewood House, Highclere Castle, Appuldurcombe House, Milton Abbey (and nearby Milton Abbas village) and in traces at Kew Gardens and many other locations. 

His style of smooth undulating grass, which would run straight to the house, clumps, belts and scatterings of trees and his serpentine lakes formed by invisibly damming small rivers were a new style within the English landscape, a 'gardenless' form of landscape gardening, which swept away almost all the remnants of previous formally patterned styles.

His landscapes were at the forefront of fashion. They were fundamentally different from what they replaced, the well-known formal gardens of England which were criticised by Alexander Pope and others from the 1710s. Starting in 1719, William Kent replaced these with more naturalistic compositions, which reached their greatest refinement in Brown's landscapes.

At Hampton Court Brown encountered Hannah More in 1782 and she described his "grammatical" manner in her literary terms: "'Now there' said he, pointing his finger, 'I make a comma, and there' pointing to another spot, 'where a more decided turn is proper, I make a colon; at another part, where an interruption is desirable to break the view, a parenthesis; now a full stop, and then I begin another subject'". Brown's patrons saw the idealised landscapes he was creating for them in terms of the Italian landscape painters they admired and collected, as Kenneth Woodbridge first observed in the landscape at Stourhead, a "Brownian" landscape (with an un-Brownian circuit walk) in which Brown himself was not involved.

Criticism
Perhaps Brown's sternest critic was his contemporary Uvedale Price, who likened Brown's clumps of trees to "so many puddings turned out of one common mould." Russell Page, who began his career in the Brownian landscape of Longleat but whose own designs have formal structure, accused Brown of "encouraging his wealthy clients to tear out their splendid formal gardens and replace them with his facile compositions of grass, tree clumps and rather shapeless pools and lakes."

Richard Owen Cambridge, the English poet and satirical author, declared that he hoped to die before Brown so that he could "see heaven before it was 'improved'." This was a typical statement reflecting the controversy about Brown's work, which has continued over the last 200 years. By contrast, a recent historian and author, Richard Bisgrove, described Brown's process as perfecting nature by "judicious manipulation of its components, adding a tree here or a concealed head of water there. His art attended to the formal potential of ground, water, trees and so gave to English landscape its ideal forms. The difficulty was that less capable imitators and less sophisticated spectators did not see nature perfected... they saw simply what they took to be nature."

This deftness of touch was recognised in his own day; one anonymous obituary writer opined: "Such, however, was the effect of his genius that when he was the happiest man, he will be least remembered; so closely did he copy nature that his works will be mistaken." In 1772, Sir William Chambers (though he did not mention Brown by name) complained that the "new manner" of gardens "differ very little from common fields, so closely is vulgar nature copied in most of them."

Architecture
Capability Brown produced more than 100 architectural drawings, and his work in the field of architecture was a natural outgrowth of his unified picture of the English country house in its setting:
"In Brown's hands the house, which before had dominated the estate, became an integral part of a carefully composed landscape intended to be seen through the eye of a painter, and its design could not be divorced from that of the garden"
Humphry Repton observed that Brown "fancied himself an architect", but Brown's work as an architect is overshadowed by his great reputation as a designer of landscapes. Repton was bound to add: "he was inferior to none in what related to the comfort, convenience, taste and propriety of design, in the several mansions and other buildings which he planned". Brown's first country house project was the remodelling of Croome Court, Worcestershire, (1751–52) for the 6th Earl of Coventry, in which instance he was likely following sketches by the gentleman amateur Sanderson Miller.

Fisherwick, Staffordshire, Redgrave Hall, Suffolk, and Claremont, Surrey, were classical, while at Corsham his outbuildings are in a Gothic vein, including the bathhouse. Gothic stable blocks and decorative outbuildings, arches and garden features constituted many of his designs. From 1771 he was assisted in the technical aspects by the master builder Henry Holland, and by Henry's son Henry Holland the architect, whose initial career Brown supported; the younger Holland was increasingly Brown's full collaborator and became Brown's son-in-law in 1773.

Subsequent reputation

Brown's reputation declined rapidly after his death, because the English Landscape style did not convey the dramatic conflict and awesome power of wild nature. A reaction against the harmony and calmness of Brown's landscapes was inevitable; the landscapes lacked the sublime thrill which members of the Romantic generation (such as Richard Payne Knight and Uvedale Price) looked for in their ideal landscape, where the painterly inspiration would come from Salvator Rosa rather than Claude Lorrain.

During the 19th century he was widely criticised, but during the twentieth century his reputation rose again. Tom Turner has suggested that the latter resulted from a favourable account of his talent in Marie-Luise Gothein's History of Garden Art which predated Christopher Hussey's positive account of Brown in The Picturesque (1927). Dorothy Stroud wrote the first full monograph on Capability Brown, fleshing out the generic attributions with documentation from country house estate offices.

Later landscape architects like William Gilpin would opine that Brown's 'natural curves' were as artificial as the straight lines that were common in French gardens. Brown's portrait by Nathaniel Dance, c. 1773, is conserved in the National Portrait Gallery, London. His work has often been favourably compared and contrasted ("the antithesis") to the œuvre of André Le Nôtre, the French jardin à la française landscape architect. He became both "rich and honoured and had 'improved' a greater acreage of ground than any landscape architect" who preceded him.

A festival to celebrate the tercentenary of Brown's birth was held in 2016. The Capability Brown Festival 2016 published a large amount of new research on Brown's work and held over 500 events across Britain as part of the celebrations. Royal Mail issued a series of Landscape Stamps in his honour in August 2016.

The Gardens Trust with support from Historic England, published Vulnerability Brown: Capability Brown landscapes at risk in October 2017 to review the issues facing the survival of these landscapes as well as suggested solutions.

A commemorative fountain in Westminster Abbey’s cloister garth was dedicated for Lancelot ‘Capability’ Brown after Evensong on Tuesday 29 May 2018 by the Dean of Westminster, the Very Reverend Dr John Hall. The fountain sits over an old monastic well in the garth. It was designed by Ptolemy Dean, the Abbey's Surveyor of the Fabric, and was developed with the assistance of gardener Alan Titchmarsh. The fountain was made in lead by sculptor Brian Turner.

Personal life

On 22 November 1744 he married in Stowe parish church, Bridget Wayet (affectionately called Biddy) from Boston, Lincolnshire.
Her father was an alderman and landowner while her family had surveyors and engineers among its members. They had eight children: Bridget in 1746, Lancelot (known as Lance), William (who died young), John in 1751, a son in 1754 who died shortly afterwards, Anne who was born and died in 1756, Margaret (known as Peggy) in 1758 and Thomas in 1761.

In 1768 he purchased the manor of Fenstanton in Huntingdonshire in East Anglia for £13,000 from Lord Northampton. This came with two manor houses, two villages and 2,668 acres of land. The property stayed in the family until it was sold in lots in 1870s and 1880s. Ownership of the property allowed him to stand for and serve as High Sheriff of Huntingdonshire from 1770 to 1771. He continued to work and travel until his sudden collapse and death on 6 February 1783, on the doorstep of his daughter Bridget Holland's house, at 6 Hertford Street, London while returning after a night out at Lord Coventry's.

Horace Walpole wrote to Lady Ossory: "Your dryads must go into black gloves, Madam, their father-in-law, Lady Nature’s second husband, is dead!". Brown was buried in the churchyard of St. Peter and St. Paul, the parish church of Brown's small estate at Fenstanton Manor. He left an estate of approximately £40,000, which included property in Cambridgeshire, Huntingdonshire and Lincolnshire. His eldest daughter Bridget married the architect Henry Holland. Brown sent two of his sons to Eton. One of them, Lancelot Brown the younger, became the MP for Huntingdon. His son John joined the Royal Navy and rose to become an admiral.

Gardens and parks

Many of Capability Brown's parks and gardens may still be visited today. A partial list of the landscapes he designed or worked on includes:

 Adderbury House, Oxfordshire (designs not thought to be implemented)
 Addington Place, Croydon
 Alnwick Castle, Northumberland
 Althorp, Northamptonshire
 Ampthill Park, Ampthill, Bedfordshire
 Ancaster House, Richmond, Surrey
 Appuldurcombe House, Isle of Wight
 Ashburnham Place, East Sussex
 Ashridge House, Hertfordshire
 Aske Hall, North Yorkshire
 Astrop Park, Northamptonshire
 Audley End, Essex
 Aynhoe Park, Northamptonshire
 The Backs, Cambridge
 Badminton House, Gloucestershire
 Ballyfin House, Ireland
 Basildon Park, Berkshire
 Battle Abbey, East Sussex
 Beaudesert, Staffordshire
 Beechwood, Bedfordshire
 Belhus, Essex
 Belvoir Castle, Leicestershire
 Benham, Berkshire
 Benwell Tower, near Newcastle upon Tyne
 Berrington Hall, Herefordshire
 Blenheim Palace, Oxfordshire
 Boarstall, Buckinghamshire (unknown if work carried out)
 Bowood House, Wiltshire
 Branches Park, Cowlinge, Suffolk
 Brentford, Ealing
 Brightling Park, Sussex
 Broadlands, Hampshire
 Brocklesby Park, Lincolnshire
 Burghley House, Lincolnshire
 Burton Constable Hall, East Riding of Yorkshire
 Burton Park, Sussex
 Burton Pynsent House, Somerset
 Byram, West Yorkshire
 Cadland, Hampshire
 Capheaton Hall, Northumberland
 Cardiff Castle, Cardiff
 Castle Ashby House, Northamptonshire
 Caversham, Berkshire
 Chalfont House, Buckinghamshire
 Charlecote, Warwickshire
 Charlton, Wiltshire
 Chatsworth, Derbyshire
 Chilham Castle, Kent
 Chillington Hall, West Midlands
 Church Stretton Old Rectory, Shropshire
 Clandon Park, Surrey
 Claremont, Surrey
 Clumber Park, Nottinghamshire
 Compton Verney, Warwickshire
 Coombe Abbey, Coventry
 Corsham Court, Wiltshire
 Croome Park, Worcestershire 
 Dodington Park, Gloucestershire
 Danson Park, Bexley Borough of London
 Darley Abbey Park, Derby
 Ditchingham Hall, Ditchingham, Norfolk
 Euston Hall, Suffolk
 Farnborough Hall, Warwickshire
 Fawley Court, Oxfordshire
 Gatton Park, Surrey
 Grimsthorpe Castle, Lincolnshire
 Hampton Court Palace, Surrey
 Harewood House, Leeds
 Heveningham Hall, Suffolk
 Highclere Castle, Hampshire
 Highcliffe Castle, Dorset
 Himley Hall, Staffordshire
 Holkham Hall, Norfolk
 Holland Park, London
 The Hoo, Hertfordshire
 Hornby Castle, North Yorkshire
 Howsham, near York
 Ickworth, Suffolk
 Ingestre, Staffordshire
 Ingress Abbey, Kent
 Kelston, Somerset
 Kew Gardens, South West London
 Kiddington Hall, Oxfordshire
 Kimberley, Norfolk
 Kimbolton Castle, Cambridgeshire
 King's Weston House, Bristol
 Kirkharle, Northumberland
 Kirtlington, Oxfordshire
 Knowsley, near Liverpool
 Kyre Park, Herefordshire
 Lacock Abbey, Wiltshire
 Laleham Abbey, Surrey
 Langley, Berkshire
 Langley Park, Buckinghamshire
 Langley Park, Norfolk
 Latimer, Buckinghamshire
 Leeds Abbey, Kent
 Littlegrove, Barnet, London
 Lleweni Hall, Clwyd
 Longford Castle, Wiltshire
 Longleat, Wiltshire
 Lowther, Cumbria
 Luton Hoo, Bedfordshire
 Madingley Hall, Cambridgeshire
 Maiden Earley, Berkshire
 Mamhead House, Devon
 Melton Constable Hall, Norfolk
 Milton Abbey, Dorset
 Moccas Court, Herefordshire
 Moor Park, Rickmansworth, Hertfordshire
 Mount Clare, Roehampton, South West London
 Navestock, Essex
 Newnham Paddox, Warwickshire
 Newton Park, Newton St Loe, Somerset
 New Wardour Castle, Wiltshire
 North Cray Place, near Sidcup, Bexley, London
 North Stoneham Park, Eastleigh, Hampshire
 Nuneham Courtenay, Oxfordshire
 Oakley, Shropshire
 Packington Park, Warwickshire
 Paddenswick Manor, West London
 Patshull Hall, Staffordshire
 Paultons Park, Hampshire
 Peper Harow House, Surrey
 Peterborough House, Hammersmith, London
 Petworth House, West Sussex
 Pishiobury, Hertfordshire
 Porter's Park, Hertfordshire
 Prior Park, Somerset
 Ragley Hall, Warwickshire
 Redgrave Park, Suffolk
 Roche Abbey, South Yorkshire
 Sandleford, Berkshire
 Savernake Forest, Wiltshire
 Schloss Richmond (Richmond Palace) in Braunschweig, Germany
 Scampston Hall, North Yorkshire
 Sheffield Park Garden, Sussex
 Sherborne Castle, Dorset
 Sledmere House, East Riding of Yorkshire
 Southill Park, Bedfordshire
 South Stoneham House, Southampton, Hampshire
 Stoke Park, Buckinghamshire
 Stowe Landscape Garden
 Syon House, West London
 Temple Newsam, Leeds
 Thorndon Hall, Essex
 Trentham Gardens, Staffordshire
 Ugbrooke Park, Devon
 Wallington, Northumberland
 Warwick Castle, Warwick
 Wentworth Castle, South Yorkshire
 West Hill, Putney, South London
 Weston Park, Staffordshire
 Whitehall, London
 Whitley Beaumont, West Yorkshire
 Widdicombe Park, near Slapton, Devon 
 Wimbledon House, South West London
 Wimbledon Park, South West London
 Wimpole Hall, Cambridgeshire
 Woburn Abbey, Bedfordshire
 Wolterton Hall, Norfolk
 Woodchester, Gloucestershire
 Woodside, Berkshire
 Wootton Place Rectory, Oxfordshire
 Wotton, Buckinghamshire
 Wrest Park, Bedfordshire
 Wrotham Park, Hertfordshire 
 Wycombe Abbey, Buckinghamshire
 Wynnstay, Clwyd, Wales
 Youngsbury, Hertfordshire

More than 30 of the gardens are open to the public.

See also
 Ha-ha
 Landscape architecture

Notes

References 
  .
 
 
  .
  .

  2nd edition, Phillimore, Chichester (1999) , .
Wickham, Louise, Gardens in History: A Political Perspective, 2012, Windgather Press, ISBN 1905119437, Amazon preview

Further reading

 Publisher: Hacker Art Books; Facsimile edition (June 1972) ; .
Gothein, Marie. Geschichte der Gartenkunst. München: Diederichs, 1988 .

External links 

 
 
Capability Brown and his Account Book, Occasional Papers from the RHS Lindley Library, volume 14, October 2016.
 FT review of Compton Verney 2011 exhibition
Capability Brown's unfinished garden

Architects from Northumberland
English landscape architects
Landscape architects
English Landscape Garden designers
English gardeners
1716 births
1783 deaths
High Sheriffs of Cambridgeshire and Huntingdonshire
People from Fenstanton